Kal-e Shur Jadid (also Romanized as Kāl-e Shūr Jadīd; also known as Kāl-e Shūr) is a village in Keybar Rural District, Jolgeh Zozan District, Khaf County, Razavi Khorasan Province, Iran. At the 2006 census, its population was 1,056, in 196 families.

References 

Populated places in Khaf County